Raków Duży  is a village in the administrative district of Gmina Moszczenica, within Piotrków County, Łódź Voivodeship, in central Poland.

The village has a population of 150.

References

Villages in Piotrków County